St. Michael and All Angels  Cathedral is the Anglican cathedral of the Diocese of Kootenay: it is in Kelowna  and the current dean is The Very Rev. Nissa Basbaum.

References
 

St. Michael and All Angels
20th-century Anglican church buildings in Canada
Anglican church buildings in British Columbia